Land Back (or #LandBack) is a decentralised campaign by Native Americans in the United States and Indigenous peoples in Canada that seeks to reestablish Indigenous sovereignty, with political and economic control of their unceded traditional lands. Activists have also used the Land Back framework in Mexico, and scholars have applied it in New Zealand and Fiji.

Land Back is part of a broader Indigenous struggle for decolonisation.

Description 
Land Back aims to reestablish Indigenous political authority over territories that Indigenous tribes claim by treaty. Scholars from the Indigenous-run Yellowhead Institute at Toronto Metropolitan University describe it as a process of reclaiming Indigenous jurisdiction. The NDN collective describes it as synonymous with decolonisation and dismantling white supremacy. Land Back advocates for Indigenous rights, preserves languages and traditions, and works toward food sovereignty, decent housing, and a clean environment.

Origins 
Land Back was introduced in 2018 by Arnell Tailfeathers, a member of the Blood Tribe (Blackfoot Confederacy). It then quickly became a hashtag (#LandBack), and now appears in artwork, on clothes and in beadwork. These creations are often used to raise funds to support water protectors and land defenders who protest against oil pipelines in North America.

In the United States, the Land Back campaign arose from the Black Hills land claim and protests at Mount Rushmore during Donald Trump's 2020 presidential campaign.

Philosophy 
The NDN collective describes the Land Back campaign as a metanarrative that ties together many different Indigenous organizations similar to the Black Lives Matter campaign. They say that the campaign enables decentralised Indigenous leadership and addresses structural racism faced by Indigenous people that is rooted in theft of their land.

Land Back promotes a return to communal land ownership of traditional and unceded Indigenous lands and rejects colonial concepts of real estate and private land ownership. Return of land is not only economic, but also implies the return of relationships and self-governance.

Land Back does not mean that non-Indigenous people should be made to leave unceded Indigenous lands.

Methods 
In some cases, land is directly returned to Indigenous people when private landowners, municipalities, or governments give the land back to Indigenous tribes. This may take the form of a simple transaction within the colonial real estate framework.

Indigenous-led projects may also use community land trusts to reserve lands for their group.

Actions 
In 2020, electronic music group, A Tribe Called Red produced a song "Land Back" on their album The Halluci Nation, to support the Wet’suwet’en resistance camp and other Indigenous-led movements.

in July 2020, activists from NDN Collective held a protest on a highway leading to Mount Rushmore, where Donald Trump was to give a campaign speech. The site, known to the Sioux in English as "The Six Grandfathers," is on sacred, unceded land, subject to the Black Hills land claim. These protestors drafted the "Land Back Manifesto", which seeks "the reclamation of everything stolen from the original Peoples".

Also in 2020, Haudenosaunee people from the Six Nations of the Grand River blockaded 1492 Land Back Lane to shut down a housing development on their unceded territory.

In 2021, Nicholas Galanin (Tlingit/Unangax) created a gigantic "Indian Land" sign – in letters reminiscent of southern California's Hollywood sign – for entry the Desert X festival.

On July 4, 2021, in Rapid City, South Dakota, a city very close to the Pine Ridge Indian Reservation, four people were arrested after climbing a structure downtown and hanging an upside-down American flag emblazoned with the words "Land Back".

Transfers 
The Wiyot people have lived for thousands of years on Duluwat Island, in Humboldt Bay on California's northern coast. In 2004 the Eureka City Council transferred land back to the Wiyot tribe, to add to land the Wiyot had purchased. The council transferred another  in 2006.

The Mashpee Wampanoag have lived in Massachusetts and eastern Rhode Island for thousands of years. Since then, a legal battle has left the tribe's status—and claim to the land—in limbo.

In October 2018, the city of Vancouver, British Columbia returned ancient burial site (the Great Marpole Midden) land back to the Musqueam people. The land is home to ancient remains of a Musqueam house site.

In 2019, the United Methodist Church gave  of historic land back to the Wyandotte Nation of Oklahoma. The US government in 1819 had promised the tribe  of land in what is now Kansas City, Kansas. When 664 Wyandotte people arrived, the land had been given to someone else.

In July 2020, the Esselen tribe purchased a  near Big Sur, California, as part of a larger $4.5m deal. This acquisition, in traditional lands, will protect old-growth forest and wildlife, and the Little Sur River.

Land on the Saanich Peninsula in British Columbia was returned to the Tsartlip First Nation in December 2020.

Management of the  National Bison Range was transferred from the U.S. Fish and Wildlife Service back to the Confederated Salish and Kootenai Tribes in 2021.

In August 2022, the Red Cliff Chippewa in northern Wisconsin had  of land along the Lake Superior shoreline returned to them from the Bayfield County government. This came after the tribe signed a 2017 memorandum of understanding with the county, acknowledging the Red Cliff Chippewa's desire to see their reservation boundaries restored in full.

See also 
 Land Buy-Back Program for Tribal Nations
 Indigenous Land Rights
 Aboriginal title in the United States
 Indigenous land rights in Australia
 Indigenous land claims in Canada
Republic of Lakotah proposal

References

External links
 The Land Back Campaign, NDN Collective
 The Halluci Nation - Land Back Ft. Boogey The Beat & Northern Voice (Official Audio) by A Tribe Called Red
 100 years of land struggle (Canada)

Indigenous rights organizations in North America
Aboriginal title in the United States
Aboriginal title in Canada
2018 establishments in North America